Abacetus suboccidentalis is a species of ground beetle in the subfamily Pterostichinae. It was described by Straneo in 1953.

References

suboccidentalis
Beetles described in 1953